Jennifer-Kirsten Barnes (born March 26, 1968) is a Canadian rower and Olympic champion.

Barnes was born in London, UK, in 1968. She competed at the 1988 Summer Olympics in the Coxless pair, with Sarah Ann Ogilvie as her rowing partner, where they came seventh.

References

External links
 Athlete Biography at Sports Reference

1968 births
Living people
Rowers from Greater London
English emigrants to Canada
Canadian expatriate sportspeople in England
Canadian female rowers
Olympic rowers of Canada
Olympic gold medalists for Canada
Rowers at the 1992 Summer Olympics
Olympic medalists in rowing
Medalists at the 1992 Summer Olympics
Rowers at the 1988 Summer Olympics
Pan American Games medalists in rowing
Pan American Games gold medalists for Canada
Rowers at the 1987 Pan American Games